The Dubois Block was listed on the National Register of Historic Places in 2014.  The listing included 11 contributing buildings and three non-contributing ones.

It includes six houses designed by Cheyenne architect William R. Dubois.

References

		
National Register of Historic Places in Laramie County, Wyoming
Beaux-Arts architecture in Wyoming
Buildings and structures completed in 1867